is a metro station on the Tanimachi Line of the Osaka Metro and a tram stop on the Hankai Uemachi Line in Abeno-ku, Osaka, Japan.

Station layout
Osaka Metro Tanimachi Line (T28)
an island platform serving two tracks under Abeno-suji.

Hankai Uemachi Line (HN02)
two side platforms serving a track each on Abeno-suji.

Surroundings

Public
Osaka City Abeno Life Safety Learning Center
Abeno Kumin Center
Osaka Municipal Abeno Library
Kansai Electric Power Company, Inc. Abeno Substation

Market
Abeno BELTA
Kansai Super
abeno CUES TOWN
Abeno Marche
Kintetsu Department Store

Others
Tsuji Group (cooking school)
Magata Shōten (Tonkatsu KYK, Curry San Marco)
Tobita Shinchi

Stations next to Abeno

External links

 Official Site 
 Official Site 

Abeno-ku, Osaka
Railway stations in Osaka
Osaka Metro stations
Railway stations in Japan opened in 1910
Railway stations in Japan opened in 1980